The London Arena (also known as London Docklands Arena) was an indoor arena and exhibition centre in Millwall, close to Cubitt Town area of Poplar, on the Isle of Dogs, in east London, England which was inaugurated in 1989 and demolished for housing in 2006. Seating capacity was up to 15,000, depending on the type of event held. It was the home of the London Knights ice hockey team, the London Towers basketball team and later the Greater London Leopards basketball team.

History
First opened in 1989, the arena was built on the grounds of a former harbour warehouse at Millwall Inner Dock as part of the redevelopment of the Docklands area, which was developed from a harbour and industrial area to a trade and residential one.

The arena could seat up to 12,500 people in the stands and up to 15,000 in concert mode. Events ranged from sport events like basketball, ice hockey, wrestling and boxing to music concerts and trade exhibitions.

Spectacor Management Group (SMG), the world's largest private facility management company, took over ownership of the London Arena in 1994. The company manages arenas and stadiums in the US and Europe, including the Louisiana Superdome, the Mile High Stadium in Denver and the Ullevaal Stadium in Oslo. During 1998, SMG entered into a partnership agreement with another American based company, Anschutz Sports Holdings, to hold an equal share in the ownership of London Arena.

Renovation

The arena received a £10 million refit in 1998, allowing the capacity of the arena to be altered hydraulically. One of the primary reasons for the refit by joint owners, Anschutz Entertainment Group, was to introduce professional ice hockey back to London with the London Knights. Along with this, the brief given to architects, HOK Sport, was to turn the arena into a major multi-entertainment centre. This involved introducing a permanent Olympic-size ice rink, 48 luxury hospitality boxes with views over the arena, two brand new team dressing rooms, a completely refurbished foyer and box office, plus a state-of-the-art SACO SmartVision video scoreboard, the only one of its kind outside the US.

However, the arena continued to struggle to attract enough visitors and events to be profitable and it never managed to become a financial success. One reason for this was its rather isolated geographical position, combined with poor local road and public transport access and limited parking space, although it was well served by the Crossharbour and London Arena DLR station. However, on days when events were held at the arena, it was not uncommon for the small station to be severely overcrowded.

Sale, closure and demolition
In 2003, the arena was sold, which, combined with the disbanding of the Ice Hockey Superleague, led to the folding of the London Knights, the only tenant at the arena at the time, leaving the arena without a permanent tenant, which made the situation worse.

In 2005, the arena was closed and was superseded as the main arena by The O2 Arena, which is in The O2 entertainment complex (formerly the Millennium Dome).

The arena was demolished in June 2006 and has since been replaced by a mostly-residential development, including the Baltimore Tower. In 2007, the Crossharbour and London Arena DLR station was renamed to simply Crossharbour. However, the London Arena name still remains on a few street signs in the area.

Notable events

Events 
On 18 November 1989, the Arenaball Transatlantic Challenge, the first ever Arena Football League exhibition game in Europe, was played there, with the Detroit Drive winning over the Chicago Bruisers 43–14.

In 1989, the WWE held its first ever United Kingdom event at the London Arena, as well as the UK Rampage 1991 event and Capital Carnage in December 1998.

Frank Sinatra played the arena in summer 1990, with the Woody Herman Orchestra conducted by Frank Sinatra Junior. Promoted by Frank Warren.

The 1998 and 1999 editions of the Brit Awards were held at the arena, and from 1989 until 2001, it was also the annual venue of the Smash Hits Poll Winners Party.

In the year 2000 World Championship Wrestling would tour the UK twice, unbeknownst it would be the last time they came to the UK before being purchased by rival promotion World Wrestling Entertainment in March 2001.
The first Tour in March was a run of three house shows including a sell out show at the Docklands Arena and then in November for televised episodes of WCW Nitro and WCW Thunder both of which sold out the Docklands Arena.

In December 2005, it housed the annual 'Crisis Open Christmas' event (held the previous year in the Millennium Dome) providing food, accommodation and various medical and social services to homeless people in London, organised by the London-based homelessness charity Crisis.

Concerts

See also
 London Docklands Development Corporation

References

External links
Description at sportsvenue-technology.com

Pictures of the demolition of the London Arena.
List of concerts and music events at the arena
Report about the Arena on an ice hockey fansite

Basketball venues in England
Sports venues demolished in 2006
Defunct indoor arenas in the United Kingdom
Defunct sports venues in London
Former buildings and structures in the London Borough of Tower Hamlets
Indoor arenas in London
Music venues completed in 1989
Music venues in London
Sports venues completed in 1989
Sports venues in London
Defunct basketball venues
Former ice hockey venues
Millwall
Demolished sports venues in the United Kingdom